The  New York Giants season was the franchise's 14th season in the National Football League.

Schedule

Game Summaries

Week 1: at Pittsburgh Pirates

Week 3: at Philadelphia Eagles

Week 4: vs. Pittsburgh Pirates

Week 5: at Washington Redskins

Week 6: vs. Philadelphia Eagles

Week 7: vs. Brooklyn Dodgers

Week 9: vs. Chicago Cardinals

Week 10: vs. Cleveland Rams

Week 11: vs. Green Bay Packers

Week 12: at Brooklyn Dodgers

Ed Danowski's pass to Dale Burnett was the last Giants touchdown on offense on Thanksgiving Day until 2022.

Week 13: vs. Washington Redskins

The Giants won the Eastern Division in a 36-0 romp of the defending champion Washington Redskins, and a right to play in the championship.

NFL Championship Game

Standings

All-Star Game
Five weeks after winning the championship, the Giants defeated the NFL All-Stars 13–10 in the first Pro Bowl on January 15, 1939.  The game was played at Wrigley Field in Los Angeles, California, where poor weather caused an attendance of just

See also
List of New York Giants seasons
1939 National Football League All-Star Game

References

New York Giants seasons
New York Giants
National Football League championship seasons
New York Giants
1930s in Manhattan
Washington Heights, Manhattan